The 158th Division was created in November 1948 under the Regulation of the Redesignations of All Organizations and Units of the Army, issued by Central Military Commission on November 1, 1948, basing on 4th Independent Division of Jichareliao Military Region. The division's history could be traced back to November 1947. Under the command of 45th Corps it took part in the Chinese civil war, including the Liaoshen Campaign, Pingjin Campaign and Hengbao Campaign.

Chronology
After the Hengbao Campaign the division detached from the corps and was put under direct command of 12th Army Group, and stationed in Shaoyang, Hunan for counter-bandit missions.

In January 1950 the division moved to Yishan, Guangxi. In April the division moved into Guangzhou to replace the 132nd Division. 

In September 1950 the division became Guangzhou Security Command. In October it renamed as 10th Public Security Division.

In January 1952 the division merged with Border Bureau of Guangdong Province.

In July 1955, following the formation of People's Liberation Army Public Security Force, the division was renamed as 10th Border Division of the Public Security Force.

In March 1956 the division was reorganized as 3rd Garrison Division and was transferred to Guangzhou Military Region's control. Merely a month later, in April 1956 the division was further renamed as 3rd Machine-gun Artillery Division. The division then stationed in Zhongshan City, Guangdong.

The machine-gun artillery division was also short-lived. In August 1956 the division was reduced and renamed as 10th Garrison Brigade. In May 1957 the brigade was inactivated and absorbed into Foshan Military Sub-district.

In April 1959 the unit was re-activated from Foshan Military Sub-district as 10th Garrison Division. The division was then composed of:
37th Garrison Regiment;
38th Garrison Regiment;
39th Garrison Regiment;
1st Maritime Patrol Unit;
2nd Maritime Patrol Unit;
3rd Maritime Patrol Unit;
5th Maritime Patrol Unit.

In December 1959, 39th Garrison Regiment and all four Maritime Patrol Units were transferred to Wanhu Fortress District's control.

In April 1956 the division was disbanded and transferred to the People's Liberation Army Navy and reorganized as 7th Institute of the Department of Defense, except its 3rd Battalion, 38th Garrison Regiment.

References

G10
Military units and formations established in 1948
Military units and formations disestablished in 1959